Gaultheria humifusa is a species of shrub in the heath family which is known by the common names alpine wintergreen and alpine spicy wintergreen. It is native to western North America, from British Columbia to California to Colorado, where it grows in moist subalpine mountain forests. It is a low, spreading shrub which may be quite small, forming flat patches on the ground or amongst rock and leaf litter. It bears solitary bell-shaped flowers with white to light pink corollas and golden anthers which, after pollination, mature into bright to dull red berrylike fruit capsules. The leaves and fruit of Gaultheria humifusa are edible.

See also
Gaultheria ovatifolia – western teaberry or Oregon spicy wintergreen
Gaultheria procumbens – eastern teaberry, checkerberry, boxberry or American wintergreen
Wintergreens

References

External links
Jepson Manual Treatment
Photo gallery

humifusa
Flora of British Columbia
Flora of the Western United States
Flora of the United States
Flora without expected TNC conservation status